Pandemis chlorograpta is a species of moth of the family Tortricidae. It is found in China in the provinces of Heilongjiang, Beijing, Shaanxi, Jiangxi, Sichuan, Fujian and Zhejiang and in Japan.

The wingspan is 17.5–27 mm. Adults are on wing in summer.

The larvae feed on Acer, Berberis, Betula, Citrus reticulata, Lysimachia clethroides, Malus pumila, Morus alba, Prunus species (including Prunus persica), Pyrus, Quercus, Ribes, Sorbus, Tilia, Ulmus and Geum chiloense. Pupation takes place on the leaves. The species overwinters in the larval stage.

References

	

Moths described in 1921
Pandemis